Joseph Jackson Parker (July 11, 1923 – December 27, 1998) was an American football end who played for two seasons in the National Football League (NFL) for the Chicago Cardinals from 1946 to 1947.

University of Texas
Parker was inducted into the University of Texas Hall of Honor in 1975. He led Texas to the SWC championship in 1942. He was co-captain of the team in 1943, when they won the SWC championship again. In 1943, he was All-American and All-SWC.

Professional career
Parker was drafted in the fifth round of the 1944 NFL Draft by the Philadelphia Eagles. He played with the Chicago Cardinals for two seasons from 1946 to 1947. He was on the 1947 Chicago Cardinals NFL championship team.

References

1923 births
1998 deaths
People from Wichita Falls, Texas
Players of American football from Texas
American football ends
Texas Longhorns football players
Philadelphia Eagles players
Chicago Cardinals players